Rhyan Bert Grant (born 26 February 1991) is an Australian professional football player who plays for A-League club Sydney FC and the Australia national team.

Born in Canowindra, New South Wales, Grant played youth football at the Australian Institute of Sport before making his professional debut for Sydney FC in 2008.

Club career

In June 2008, Grant received an invitation to take up a scholarship at the AIS in Canberra where he was selected despite not fitting into the age criteria for the 2008 scholarship program. After impressing during his three months in the nation's capital, he was signed as a member of Sydney FC's inaugural National Youth League squad in September 2008.

This team finished as champions for the 2008–09 season. He made 15 appearances for the National Youth League team during the season, scoring one goal. After Sydney FC Youth had clinched the National Youth League minor premiership by winning 13 and drawing two of their 18 regular season games, they progressed to the Grand Final where they met Adelaide United at Hindmarsh Stadium in Adelaide on 21 February 2009. Grant played the full 90 minutes as Sydney FC triumphed 2–0.

During the National Youth League season, Grant also managed to earn a call-up to the senior team. On 21 December 2008, Grant made his senior debut for Sydney FC against Perth Glory at the Sydney Football Stadium, appearing as a 78th-minute substitute for Antony Golec. The game was won 4–1 by Perth Glory. He was an unused substitute as Sydney FC lost 3–2 to Melbourne Victory at the Telstra Dome on 27 December 2008. Grant then appeared as a 71st-minute substitute for Shannon Cole as Sydney FC lost 2–0 to Adelaide United at the Adelaide Oval on 3 January 2009. On 11 January 2009, Rhyan Grant made his starting debut against Wellington Phoenix at the Sydney Football Stadium, and played the full 90 minutes as Sydney FC won 1–0.

He also played a full game in Sydney FC's 3–1 defeat by Queensland Roar at Suncorp Stadium on 17 January 2009, and provided the cross from which Kofi Danning scored in the 25th minute. Rhyan Grant also started Sydney FC's final game of the A-League season, a 4–0 win over the Newcastle Jets at the Sydney Football Stadium on 25 January 2009. He was replaced in the 86th minute by Terry McFlynn.

Grant finished the 2008–09 A-League season with five senior appearances. He wore shirt number 34 in these five matches. He was then given shirt number 23 for the 2009–10 A-League season as he earned a full senior contract.

After a successful start to his senior career, Grant looked to cement a permanent first team spot in the 2009–10 season after impressing early in Sydney's undefeated run of pre-season trials.

He ended up playing 9 games, starting 3, and winning his first Premiership.

He signed a new two-year contract with Sydney FC on 27 August 2010.

Grant scored his first senior goal for Sydney FC against the Central Coast Mariners in a 1–1 draw during the 2010–11 A-League season.

At the end of the 2012–13 season, Grant was selected to play for the A-League All Star team against Manchester United in Sydney on 20 July 2013. Grant was substituted onto the field for Michael McGlinchey in the match.

Grant's 2013–14 campaign ended prematurely in Round 3 at home to the Western Sydney Wanderers. Grant was contesting a tackle, when his foot was caught in the pitch causing him to rupture his anterior cruciate ligament. The injury required surgery and kept him out for the rest of the season.

The following year, Grant's long-awaited return from injury came on 22 November 2014 when he was selected on the bench against the newly re-branded Melbourne City FC in Round 7. Grant was substituted onto the field for Ali Abbas in the 68th minute. For the rest of the season, Grant was consistently a part of the match-day squads, but mainly used of the bench, starting only a handful of games. The new Sydney FC coach, Graham Arnold, cited the reason for this was largely due to Grant missing a lot of tactical sessions during pre-season as he was returning from injury. Grant scored his first goal since coming back from injury in the Round 18 clash of the 2014–15 A-League season against Central Coast Mariners at Allianz Stadium with a 25-yard screamer in which Sydney FC would go on to win 4–2. Days later, Grant was rewarded for his form after returning from injury with a 2-year contract extension, along with teammate Sebastian Ryall. Prior to Grant's injury in 2013, he was mainly deployed as a utility player at the club but Arnold believed he would excel at right fullback and had agreed with Grant to concentrate on these qualities in the 2015 off-season.

Grant began his transformation as specialized fullback during the 2015–16 A-League season, starting in all matches up until Round 26 as either a right or left back, missing only one game through suspension.

The 2016–17 season was another breakout season for Grant. He played every minute of every match in all competitions of the season, scoring 2 and assisting 5 while mainly playing in the right-back position. He would continue his success by scoring in the 69th minute of the grand final against Melbourne Victory to make it 1–1, where Sydney would eventually win 4–2 on penalties to lift the double. His form throughout the season earned him a call-up to Australian national soccer team 30-man train-on squad for the 2017 Confederations Cup. However, on 30 May 2017, it was announced that he did not make the final 23-man squad. Grant was also rewarded for his fantastic season by being selected for the 2016–17 PFA Team of the Season.

Grant suffered another anterior cruciate ligament injury in July 2017, keeping him out of the game for several months. The injury was sustained to his left knee this time, whereas the injury in 2013 was his right knee. Grant was able to return to training by the end of the season and had made himself available for selection for the final game of the regular season. However, ultimately Grant did not appear in either of Sydney FC's remaining two games of the season.

On Saturday, 10 November 2018 Grant went on to play his 150th appearance in the A-League against Newcastle Jets. One month later on 21 December 2018, he became the first player in Sydney FC history to reach ten years as player at the club. The occasion was marked two days later when he played against Perth Glory, the same team he played in his league debut ten years earlier. He became only the third player to achieve this in A-League history, after Leigh Broxham at Melbourne Victory and Andrew Durante at Wellington Phoenix. Grant's early season form was rewarded with a call-up to the national team for the 2019 AFC Asian Cup in January. This resulted in him missing seven games for the Sky Blues during a busy January period for the club before returning for the Round 17 match against Melbourne City. Grant started in all remaining league games and by season's end found himself again selected in the PFA A-League Team of the Season. A minor hamstring concern in the final round of the season against Newcastle Jets could not stop the 28-year-old from participating in the A-League final series, starting in the home semi-final against arch rivals, Melbourne Victory. With Sydney leading the game 5–0, Grant was substituted off in the 71st minute to save him for the Grand Final. The following weekend, Grant played in the Grand Final decider against Perth Glory at Optus Stadium. Throughout the game, Grant had a growing duel with former Socceroo, Jason Davidson which eventually lead to Grant receiving a yellow card in the 88th minute. Prior to and after this, the crowd of close to 60,000 had rung out a chorus of boos every time Grant had touched the ball. The effect of the constant taunting resulted in Grant putting his hand up to take a penalty in the shootout when the match ended nil-all after extra time. He was the third Sydney player to convert his penalty on the way to the club winning the shoot-out 4–1.

He scored the winning goal in the 2020 A-League Grand Final, off the chest from inside the six-yard box, in the 100th minute, winning his third Championship as well as his third Premiership as Sydney FC finished top of the table that season also. He won the Joe Marston Medal as man of the match.

International career
He was selected for the training squad for Australia's 2009 FIFA U-20 World Cup team. Grant then went on to play in several competitions with the Young Socceroos in the Netherlands, one of which they won.

Grant was chosen as a train on player for Australia's friendly against South Korea in November 2018. For the match against Lebanon he was selected for the squad and made his debut, playing the full match. In December 2018, it was announced that Grant had made the final 23-man squad for the 2019 AFC Asian Cup. Grant replaced an injured Josh Risdon at half-time of the first game of the Group Stage against Jordan. He would go on to play the remaining fixtures for Australia, totaling 5 appearances for the campaign, whilst wearing the number 4 jersey previously worn by Socceroo great, Tim Cahill.

On September 7, 2021, Grant scored his first international goal as Socceroos beat Vietnam 1–0 away; he was earlier responsible for a potential handball on the penalty area before getting relief as no penalty was given.

Career statistics

Club

International

International goals

Honours

Club
Sydney FC
 A-League Premiership (3): 2009–10, 2016–17, 2019–20
 A-League Championship (3): 2016–17, 2018–19, 2019–20
 National Youth League Championship: 2008–09

Individual
 A-League All Star: 2013, 2022
 PFA A-League Team of the Season (4): 2016–17, 2018–19, 2019–20, 2020–21
 Joe Marston Medal: 2020

References

External links
 
 

1991 births
Living people
Australian soccer players
Australia under-20 international soccer players
Australia international soccer players
Association football utility players
A-League Men players
Victorian Premier League players
Sydney FC players
Australian Institute of Sport soccer players
New South Wales Institute of Sport alumni
People from the Central West (New South Wales)
Association football fullbacks
Association football midfielders
2019 AFC Asian Cup players
Sportsmen from New South Wales
Soccer players from New South Wales